The Cardiff Centenary Walk is a tourist walkway through Cardiff city centre in Wales. Established as part of Cardiff's centennial celebrations to mark 100 years of city status in 2005, it has 41 points of interest, either Cardiff landmarks or significant historic sites. The route is marked by waymarkers on the pavement, which also direct pedestrians to the next waymarker.

Waymarkers numbers

Notes

External links
 The Official Site
 The Cardiff Centenary Walk route
 The Cardiff Centenary Walk map/guide 

Tourist attractions in Cardiff
Recreational walks in Wales